Dutch School may refer to:
Dutch school (cartography)
Dutch School (music)
Dutch School (painting)
Dutch School (architecture)
Dutch School (sculpture)

Dutch school languages
German
French
English
Dutch